Henri Leconte was the defending champion, but lost in the quarterfinals this year.

Michael Stich won the title, beating Magnus Larsson 6–4, 4–6, 6–3 in the final.

Seeds

Draw

Finals

Top half

Bottom half

References

 Main Draw

1994 Gerry Weber Open